Daniel De Mussenden Carey (born 24 December 1969) is an English record producer, songwriter, mixer and remixer. He owns his own studio in South London and runs the record label Speedy Wunderground.

In 2014, Carey received two Mercury Prize nominations for his production work on two nominated albums: Everybody Down by Kae Tempest and First Mind by Nick Mulvey. In 2019, Carey earned two further Mercury Prize nominations for his production work on the albums Schlagenheim by Black Midi and Dogrel by Fontaines D.C.

Carey recently produced and plays synthesizer on the debut album by the British band Wet Leg.
Carey previously produced for London-based labels Dust Records, Dust2Dust and DMI. He was also one half of the group Danmass, which released music on all three labels and Skint Records. Danmass released one album, Formfreaks, on Dust2Dust in 1999.

Discography

References

External links
"About Dan Carey" at Speedy Wunderground
 Dan Carey on AllMusic
 

English record producers
English songwriters
Living people
1969 births